The 1970 International Cross Country Championships was held in Vichy, France, on March 22, 1970.  An alternate women's championship was held one day earlier in Frederick, Maryland, United States at the VFW Country Club, on March 21, 1970.  A report on the Vichy event as well as on the Frederick event was given in the Glasgow Herald.

Complete results for men, junior men,  women (Vichy),  women (Frederick), medallists, 
 and the results of British athletes were published.

Medallists

Individual Race Results

Men's (7.5 mi / 12.1 km)

Junior Men's (4.35 mi / 7.0 km)

Women's (Vichy, 1.9 mi / 3.0 km)

Women's (Frederick, 2.5 mi / 4.0 km)

Team Results

Men's

Junior Men's

Women's (Vichy)

Women's (Frederick)

Participation
An unofficial count yields the participation of 211 athletes from 17 countries.

 (5)
 (2)
 (18)
 (13)
 (20)
 (20)
 (19)
 (18)
 (5)
 (7)
 (6)
 (18)
 (14)
 (14)
 (7)
 (13)
 (12)

See also
 1970 in athletics (track and field)

References

International Cross Country Championships
International Cross Country Championships
Cross
International Cross Country Championships
Cross country running in France
Cross country running in the United States
International track and field competitions hosted by the United States
1970 in American sports
1970 in sports in Maryland
Track and field in Maryland